St Helens R.F.C. is a professional rugby league club in St Helens, Merseyside. Formed in 1873, St Helens are one of the 22 original members of the Northern Rugby Football Union founded in 1895. Since then, more than 1,200 players have appeared for the club's first team. Kel Coslett has made the most career appearances for St Helens, having played 531 games between 1962 and 1976. Coslett is also the club's all-time top goal scorer (1,639) and point scorer (3,413). The try scoring record is held by Tom van Vollenhoven, who touched down 392 times for the club.

The following is a list of St Helens R.F.C. players. Players are listed alphabetically. Appearances are for first-team competitive matches only.

Players

References

External links
St. Helens R.F.C. Heritage Numbers
Saints Heritage Society
Rugby League Project

Players
 
St. Helens R.F.C. players